The 1984–85 Liga Alef season saw Beitar Netanya (champions of the North Division) and Hapoel Beit Shemesh (champions of the South Division) win the title and promotion to Liga Artzit. Hapoel Acre also promoted after promotion play-offs.

North Division

South Division

Promotion play-offs

Hapoel Acre promoted to Liga Artzit.

References
 Football 1985/86 (Page 134), Israel Football Association, 1985 

Liga Alef seasons
Israel
3